The Keiser Seahawks are the athletic teams that represent Keiser University, located in West Palm Beach, Florida, in intercollegiate sports as a member of the National Association of Intercollegiate Athletics (NAIA), primarily competing in the Sun Conference (formerly known as the Florida Sun Conference (FSC) until after the 2007–08 school year) since the 2015–16 academic year. Prior to July 2015, the Seahawks represented Northwood University's West Palm Beach campus.

Varsity teams
Keiser competes in 26 intercollegiate varsity sports: Men's sports include baseball, basketball, cross country, football, golf, lacrosse, soccer, swimming, tennis, track & field (indoor and outdoor) and wrestling; while women's sports include basketball, cross country, flag football, golf, lacrosse, soccer, softball, swimming, tennis, track & field (indoor and outdoor) and volleyball; and co-ed sports include eSports and spirit squad. Club sports include equestrian and fishing.

Championships

NAIA team national championships
The Seahawks have won 17 NAIA team national championships.

 Women's golf: 2003, 2015, 2016, 2021
 Women's tennis: 2003
 Women's soccer: 2019, 2020
 Women's lacrosse: 2021
 Women's swimming and diving: 2022, 2023
 Men's golf: 2022
 Men's swimming and diving: 2018, 2019, 2020, 2022, 2023
 Men's soccer: 2021

Notes

NACDA Directors' Cup

The Seahawks won the NACDA Directors' Cup for being the NAIA's highest performing overall athletic program for the 2020–21 season.

Notable people
 Rollie Massimino, men's basketball head coach from 2006–2017

References

External links